Allan Herbert Miller Fels  (born 7 February 1942) is an Australian economist, lawyer and public servant. He was most widely known in his role as chairman of the Australian Competition & Consumer Commission (ACCC) from its inception in 1995 until 30 June 2003. Upon his retirement from the ACCC, he became foundation dean of the Australia and New Zealand School of Government (ANZSOG) until January 2013. 

He was made an Officer of the Order of Australia in June 2001. His book, Tough Customer: Chasing a better deal for battlers, was published in September 2019 by Melbourne University Press. Fels was awarded a Doctor of Laws (honoris causa) by the University of Melbourne in February 2022.

Family
Fels was married to Maria-Isabel Cid, until she died in September 2015 and has two daughters, Isabella and Teresa Fels. Australian Story ran a program on him and his family in 2002.

References

External links
ANZSOG biography
Being Allan Fels - Australian Story transcript

People from Perth, Western Australia
1942 births
Living people
University of Western Australia alumni
Duke University alumni
Academic staff of Monash University
Australian public servants
Australian Anglicans
Anglican pacifists
Public servants of Western Australia
Officers of the Order of Australia